Mahanga may refer to

Places
 Mahanga village and Community Development Block of Cuttack district, in Indian state of Odisha
 Mahanga (Vidhan Sabha constituency), a Vidhan Sabha constituency of Cuttack district, Odisha, India

People
 Māhanga, the Maori chieftain and ancestor of the Ngāti Māhanga hapu
 Milton Mahanga (1955-), Tanzanian politician